Lee So-ra (born 22 July 1994) is an inactive South Korean tennis player.

She has won seven singles and 16 doubles titles on the ITF Women's Circuit. On 23 November 2015, she reached her career-high singles ranking of world No. 247. On 2 May 2016, she peaked at No. 265 in the doubles rankings. She advanced to the second round of a WTA Tour event at the 2012 Hansol Korea Open for the first time in her career when Maria Kirilenko retired at 1–1 in their match.

ITF Circuit finals

Singles: 9 (7 titles, 2 runner–ups)

Doubles: 29 (16 titles, 13 runner–ups)

External links
 
 
 

1994 births
Living people
South Korean female tennis players
Tennis players at the 2010 Asian Games
Tennis players at the 2014 Asian Games
Tennis players at the 2018 Asian Games
Universiade medalists in tennis
Universiade gold medalists for South Korea
Universiade bronze medalists for South Korea
Asian Games competitors for South Korea
Medalists at the 2015 Summer Universiade
People from Wonju
Sportspeople from Gangwon Province, South Korea
21st-century South Korean women